Moberly Area Community College (MACC) is a public community college based in Moberly, Missouri.  In addition to the Moberly campus, MACC has four campuses across a large portion of Northeastern and central Missouri: Columbia, Hannibal, Kirksville, and Mexico. The college is accredited by the Higher Learning Commission. In 2010 MACC enrollment was approximately 5,600 students.

History

MACC was founded in 1927 as Moberly Junior College as a part of the Moberly Public School system. Temporary facilities housed the classes until 1931 when a permanent building was constructed on 29 acres, which would today be the current MACC campus. The college experienced rapid growth in the 1970s and 1980s, especially after a public vote led to the establishment of a community college district encompassing a 16-county area in northern and central Missouri. During this time, MACC gained accreditation from the North Central Association of Colleges and Schools. In 1990, the school was renamed Moberly Area Community College.

Major campus improvements include the $2.5 Million dollar Fine Arts wing constructed in 1984, providing a new library, classrooms, 600-seat auditorium, and Student Commons area. The Career Center was also expanded by nearly 22,000 square feet, allowing the consolidation of all vocational programs. College Hall, later renamed Komar Hall in honor of longtime MACC President Dr. Andrew Komar, Jr., was built in 1993. The large three-story structure provided space for Administrative and business offices along with new chemistry, physics, and biology classrooms and labs. Fitzsimmons-Johns Arena, named for the two most successful basketball coaches in MACC history, Cotton Fitzsimmons and Maury John, is the home court for MACC Greyhounds men's and women's basketball as well as Missouri high school basketball playoff games and music concerts. One of the newest additions to the MACC-Moberly campus is the McCormick Commons and Residential Center, built in 2007. The 2,700-foot commons provides recreational activities, a computer lab, and laundry room while also serving as the main entry to the men's and women's dorms.

Administration
The current President of MACC is Dr. Jeff Lashley. Evelyn Jorgenson, Ph.D held the position from 1996 until her retirement in June 2013. Jorgenson followed Andrew Komar, Jr., Ph.D, who oversaw major growth in the college during his 25 years as president. Doctor Komar serves as President Emeritus of MACC. In November 2012 Jorgensen accepted a position as president of Northwest Arkansas Community College effective July 1, 2012. On December 11, 2012 the MACC Board of Trustees announced that Jeff Lashley, Ph.D would succeed Jorgenson as president effective July 1, 2013. Lashley has been on the MACC staff since 1996, first as an instructor, then as Dean of Academic Affairs, then as Vice-President for Instruction, and now as President.

Campus Locations
Columbia, Missouri - MACC - Columbia, Missouri Campus 

Hannibal, Missouri - MACC - Hannibal, Missouri Campus 

Kirksville, Missouri - MACC - Kirksville, Missouri Campus 

Mexico, Missouri - MACC - Mexico, Missouri Campus

Moberly, Missouri - MACC - Moberly, Missouri Campus

Online - MACC - Online/Virtual Campus

Athletics
MACC offers men's and women's basketball, competing in the National Junior College Athletic Association (NJCAA) Division I, in the Missouri Community College Athletic Conference.

Men
The men's basketball team is one of the winningest programs in junior college history, with four NJCAA Championships—in 1954, 1955, 1966, and 1967-three National runners-up, and four third-place finishes. Through the 2015-16 season, the Greyhounds have 27 national tournament appearances, which ranks second overall. The "Hounds" have recorded the most wins at the National Tournament, with 66. The four championships came under the direction of well-known college and pro basketball coaches Maury John (1946-1958) and Cotton Fitzsimmons (who coached at MACC from 1958 to 1967). Future Div I head coaches Charlie Spoonhour (1972–74), Dana Altman (1983-86) and Jay Spoonhour (2009–12) have led the Greyhounds.

Pat Smith Head Coach MACC stats: Career Record: 648-376. Last two seasons at Moberly Area CC: 52-16. Record at Moberly Area CC: 190-76 (8 seasons). National Tournament Appearances: NJCAA 1993, 1994, 2001, 2003, 2016. Highest National Tournament finish: 5th (2001–02). 10 straight 20 win seasons. NJCAA Region 16 Director. Record at Trinity Valley CC: 126-63  (6 seasons: 2006-12).

Women
The MACC women's team won the NJCAA National Championship in 1982, and have made 13 national tournament appearances. The Lady Greyhounds have had 21 NJCAA All-American selections. 58 players have gone on to play at the NCAA Division 1 level.

Notable alumni
 Martha Mears - singer on radio and in films in the 1930s and 1940s who dubbed singing voices for movie stars; graduated in Moberly Junior College's first class
 Mitch Richmond - National Basketball Association Rookie of the Year, six-time NBA All-Star
 Gerald Wilkins - 14-year NBA veteran (1985-1999); Knicks, Cavaliers, Grizzlies, Magic 
 Qyntel Woods - professional basketball player who currently plays for AZS Koszalin

References

External links
 Official website
 Official athletics website

Educational institutions established in 1927
Community colleges in Missouri
Buildings and structures in Randolph County, Missouri
Education in Randolph County, Missouri
Education in Columbia, Missouri
Education in Knox County, Missouri
Education in Marion County, Missouri
Education in Adair County, Missouri
Education in Audrain County, Missouri
Education in Macon County, Missouri
NJCAA athletics
Two-year colleges in the United States
1927 establishments in Missouri